Tyler Robert Rosenlund (born September 13, 1986) is a Canadian soccer player currently playing for Whitecaps FC 2 in the USL.

Career

College and amateur 
Rosenlund played college soccer at the University of California, Santa Barbara. He was a member of the UCSB Gauchos squad that reached the 2004 NCAA Division I Men's Soccer Championship which lost to Indiana Hoosiers on penalties.  He eventually won a National Championship with the Gauchos by beating the UCLA Bruins in the 2006 NCAA Division I Men's Soccer Championship.

Professional

Scandinavia 
After the 2006 NCAA season ended, Rosenlund left UC Santa Barbara early.  He trialed with Allmänna Idrottsklubben of the Swedish Premier Division Allsvenskan and later moved on another trial with IFK Mariehamn in the Finnish Premier Division, Veikkausliiga.  He failed to secure a contract with either club, but made one appearance for IFK Mariehamn in the Finnish League Cup.

After his short spell in Finland he headed back to Sweden and secured a contract with Åtvidabergs FF in the Swedish second tier, Superettan.  He made a couple of appearances for ÅFF before he was released by the club.

Canada 
On March 21, 2008, Toronto FC announced Tyler Rosenlund was signed to a senior developmental contract.<  He made his Toronto FC debut on April 5, 2008, appearing as an 83rd-minute substitute during a 4–1 defeat to D.C. United.  He was the first Canadian-born player to score for Toronto FC, which happened at BMO Field against Chivas USA on September 6, 2008.

He was released by Toronto in February 2009 and signed later with Surrey United.

Rochester Rhinos 
Rosenlund signed with USSF Division 2 Professional League club Rochester Rhinos in March 2010.  He was a mainstay of the club in 2010 and 2011, being named team most valuable player in the latter year.  Rochester re-signed Rosenlund for the 2012 season on November 21, 2011.

Whitecaps FC 2 
Rosenlund played briefly for Surrey United Firefighters in the Vancouver Metro Soccer League following his departure from Rochester.  The stay was short-lived as it was announced on February 26, 2015, that Rosenlund had joined Whitecaps FC 2.

International 
Rosenlund made his first international appearance with the Canadian men's national team on January 30, 2008.  Rosenlund entered Canada's friendly against Martinique in the 72nd minute in a 1-0 Friendly win.  He has also featured extensively for the U-17 and U-20 Canadian teams and was active for Canada's U-23 team for Olympic Qualifying.

Honors

Rochester Rhinos 
 USSF Division 2 Pro League Regular Season Champions (1): 2010

UC Santa Barbara 
 NCAA Men's Division I Soccer Championship (1): 2006

Individual 
 2009: Toronto FC Vs. Chivas USA - Man of the Match
 2006: NCAA Division 1 College Cup Final Four All-Star Team
 2005: Named to the Missouri Athletic Club Hermann Trophy Watch List
 2004: Freshman All-American
 2003: B.C. Soccer Athlete Of The Year

References

External links 
  (archive)
 Whitecaps FC 2 player profile
 Rochester Rhinos player profile
 Toronto FC player profile
 UC Santa Barbara player profile

1986 births
Living people
Association football midfielders
Åtvidabergs FF players
Canada men's international soccer players
Canadian expatriate soccer players
Canadian expatriate sportspeople in Finland
Canadian expatriate sportspeople in Sweden
Canadian expatriate sportspeople in the United States
Canadian people of Scandinavian descent
Canadian soccer players
Expatriate footballers in Finland
Expatriate footballers in Sweden
IFK Mariehamn players
Major League Soccer players
Rochester New York FC players
Soccer players from Vancouver
Toronto FC players
UC Santa Barbara Gauchos men's soccer players
USSF Division 2 Professional League players
USL Championship players
Whitecaps FC 2 players